David Mann may refer to:

Entertainment
David Mann (actor) (born 1966), American stage actor
David Mann (artist) (1940–2004), American artist of the custom motorcycle subculture
 Dave Mann, saxophonist, member of Blood, Sweat & Tears
David Mann (songwriter) (1916–2002), American writer of popular songs
David Mann (Duel), a character from the movie Duel, a film directed by Steven Spielberg

Politics and government
David E. Mann (born 1924), U.S. Assistant Secretary of the Navy (Research, Engineering and Systems), 1977 to 1981
David S. Mann (born 1939), Mayor of Cincinnati, Ohio and U.S. Representative

Sports
Dave Mann (archer), Canadian archer
David Mann (cyclist) (born 1962), British racing cyclist
Dave Mann (gridiron football) (1932–2012), NFL player from 1955 to 1957, CFL player 1958 and from 1960 to 1970